The  (Latinized as hetaeria) was a term for a corps of bodyguards during the Byzantine Empire.

Etymology and usage of the term
 means 'the Company', echoing the ancient Macedonian Companions and the Classical Greek aristocrats who attended .

The term  was also applied to the smaller bodyguards of thematic military commanders, headed by a count, and from the 13th century on, it was employed in a generic sense for the armed retinues of magnates, bound by oath to their master.

Imperial 
The exact origin, role, and structure of the Imperial  are unclear. The term first appears in the early 9th century, as the bodyguard of Emperor Leo V the Armenian on campaign. It is unclear, however, whether the usage is technical, referring to a specific unit, or simply as a term for bodyguard; it is not until the reign of Theophilos that the unit is definitely attested. John B. Bury theorized that it was the evolution of the earlier , but this supposition was rejected by John Haldon as the two units are mentioned as co-existing in some sources.

Magyars), Franks and Arabs. Hans-Joachim Kühn even refers to it as a "Byzantine Foreign Legion".

The  of the 9th–10th centuries was divided in several units: three or four according to the sources, distinguished by their epithets and each, at least originally, under is respective .

It was a very important position in the late 9th and first half of the 10th centuries, as he was in charge of the emperor's security, and was entrusted with delicate assignments. It is telling that the future emperor Romanos Lekapenos held this post, and was succeeded by his son Christopher Lekapenos.

A 'Middle ' is attested in sources, and the possible existence of a 'Lesser ' is implied by the reference to Stylianos Zaoutzes as  under Emperor Michael III. The historian Warren Treadgold estimates the total strength of the Imperial  in the early 10th century at 1,200 men.

According to Haldon, this may be evidence that the  "was developing already into a show force, and eventually no longer served as a fighting part of the imperial guard".

The post of  also survived, and, detached from its military duties, remained an important court position: it was held by several influential palace eunuchs in the 11th century, and by second-rank nobles and junior relatives of the Byzantine imperial family, such as George Palaiologos, in the Komnenian period. In the Palaiologan period, it was held by members of prominent noble families.

See also
 Hetair-, a Greek linguistic root
Somatophylakes

Footnotes

References

Sources 

 

  

Military units and formations established in the 9th century
Byzantine mercenaries
Guards units of the Byzantine Empire